The Iberoamerican Association of Postgraduate Universities, also known as AUIP, is an international non-governmental organization, recognized by the UNESCO, whose primary objective is the promotion of postgraduate and doctoral studies in Ibero-America.  Currently is conformed by more than 130 higher education institutions from Spain, Portugal, Latin America, and the Caribbean.

See also

Notes

External links
 Iberoamerican Association of Postgraduate Universities - Official site (in Spanish)

International college and university associations and consortia
Ibero-America